Winter X Games XVII (re-titled Winter X Games Aspen '13; styled as Winter X Games Seventeen in the official logo) were held from January 24 to January 27, 2013, in Aspen, Colorado. They were the 12th consecutive Winter X Games to be held in Aspen. The events were broadcast on ESPN. That year, the Winter X Games were also held in Tignes, France, from March 20 to 22. Events included skiing, snowboarding, and snowmobiling.

Sports
The following were the events at Winter X Games 17.

Skiing
Snowboarding
Snowmobiling

Highlights

Results

Medal count

References

External links
  Winter X Games XVII Page

Winter X Games
2013 in multi-sport events
2013 in American sports
Sports in Colorado
Sport in Savoie
Pitkin County, Colorado
2013 in sports in Colorado
2013 in snowboarding
2013 in alpine skiing
Winter multi-sport events in the United States
International sports competitions hosted by the United States